Comme à la maison is the first live album recorded by French artist Christophe Maé and his second album overall. It was recorded and released in 2008 and met huge success in France and Belgium (Wallonia), both under its CD and DVD versions.

Background 
The album was recorded on 18 and 19 June 2008, on a beach in the south of Corsica, and first released on 26 September 2008. It contains songs from his debut album Mon paradis, such as the hit singles "On s'attache", "Parce qu'on sait jamais", "Belle demoiselle", plus some new songs, including a tribute to Bob Marley composed of a medley, and a duet with William Baldé. A gospel-style choir and accordionist Régis Gizavo participated in the concert.

Two songs were released as singles : "C'est ma terre", only available digitally (#18 in Belgium, #91 in Switzerland), and "Mon p'tit gars", dedicated to the singer's son named Jules, which was a number two hit in France (and #33 in Belgium).

Critical reception and chart performance 

The album was generally well received by the musical critics. AllMusic stated : "While it's disappointing that Comme à la Maison doesn't include more surprises than it does, whether in the form of new material or cover songs, the live performance is still impressive and casts the songs of Mon paradis in a new light, one that highlights Maé's African influence in particular."

The album met great success in France and Belgium (Wallonia) where it topped the charts. In France, it went straight to number-one on 4 October 2008, then dropped quickly, but managed to climb to number-one again in its seventh week, and totaled 18 weeks in the top ten. In Belgium, the album debuted at #3, then topped the chart for two weeks. It stayed for 22 weeks in the top ten.

The DVD was number-one for seven non consecutive weeks in France and Belgium.

Track listings 

 CD 1
 "Mon paradis" (live) (Domisseck, Maé) – 7:44
 "Ma vie est une larme" (live) (Dondrimont, Maé) – 3:54
 "Va voir ailleurs" (live) (Dondrimont, Maé) – 5:39
 "On s'attache" (live) (Dondrimont, Florence, Maé) – 5:46
 "Ça fait mal" (live) (Dondrimont, Maé) – 5:09
 "Belle demoiselle" (live) (Domisseck) – 4:51
 "Maman" (live) (Maé, Oricelli) – 5:40
 "Mon p'tit gars" (live) – 4:03
 CD 2
 "Moi j'ai pas le sou" (live) – 4:08
 "Sa danse donne" (live) – 3:51
 "Mon père spirituel" (live) (Maé) – 6:28
 "Tribute to Bob Marley" (live) – 3:05
 "Parce qu'on sait jamais" (live) (Florence, Jacquot) – 3:45
 "C'est ma terre" (live) (Florence, Maé, Oricelli) – 8:46
 "C'est ma terre" (music video)
 "Mon père spirituel" (from the DVD live)

 DVD - collector version
 "Mon paradis" (live) – 7:44
 "Ma vie est une larme" (live) – 3:54
 "Va voir ailleurs" (live) – 5:39
 "On s'attache" (live) – 5:46
 "Ça fait mal" (live) – 5:09
 "Belle demoiselle" (live) – 4:51
 "Maman" (live) – 5:40
 "Mon p'tit gars" (live) – 4:59
 "Moi j'ai pas le sou" (live - duet with William Baldé) – 4:02
 "Sa danse donne" (live) – 3:51
 "Mon père spirituel" (live) – 6:28
 "Tribute to Bob Marley" (live) – 3:05
 "Parce qu'on sait jamais" (live) – 3:45
 "C'est ma terre" (live) – 8:47

Source: Allmusic

Charts

Weekly charts

Year-end charts

Release history

Certifications

References 

Christophe Maé albums
2008 live albums